The Jefferson Cup Stakes is an American Thoroughbred horse race run in mid-June near the end of the Churchill Downs Spring Meet in Louisville, Kentucky. A race on turf, it is open to three-year-old horses of either gender.

For 2010, the purse was dropped from $200,000 to $100,000 and the race was downgraded from a Grade II event at a mile and an eighth (9 furlongs)  to a Grade III level at a mile and a sixteenth.

Since inception, the Jefferson Cup Stakes has been contested at various distances:
 5.5 furlongs : 1977–1981
  miles : 1982, 2010–2013
  miles : 1983–2009

Records
Speed  record
  miles – 1:47.27 – King Cugat (2000)
  miles – 1:43.66 – Banned (2011)

Winners of the Jefferson Cup Stakes since 1999

Earlier winners

 1993 – Lt. Pinkerton (1:48.27)
 1992 – Senor Thomas (1:49.80)
 1991 – Hanging Curve (1:50.89)
 1990 – Divine Warning (1:52.20)
 1989 – Shy Tom (1:49.20)
 1988 – Stop the Stage (1:51.60)
 1987 – Fast Forward (1:50)
 1986 – Buffalo Beau (1:52.80)
 1985 – Aveys Brother (1:50)
 1984 – Coax Me Chad (1:50.60)
 1983 – Pron Regard (1:51.60)
 1982 – Wavering Monarch (1:44.20)
 1981 – Talent Town (1:05.40)
 1980 – Golden Derby (1:04.20)
 1979 – Rockhill Native (1:05.20)
 1978 – Future Hope (1:05.20)
 1977 – Old Jake (1:04.80)

References

Graded stakes races in the United States
Flat horse races for three-year-olds
Turf races in the United States
Recurring sporting events established in 1977
Churchill Downs horse races
1977 establishments in Kentucky